The Avicenna Prize for Ethics in Science is awarded every two years by UNESCO and rewards individuals and groups in the field of ethics in science.
The aim of the award is to promote ethical reflection on issues raised by advances in science and technology, and to raise global awareness of the importance of ethics in science. The prize was named after the 11th century Persian physician and philosopher Avicenna (980-1038).

The Prize consists of a gold medal, a certificate, US$10,000, and a one-week academic visit to the Islamic Republic of Iran.

Since it was founded, the award has been given to five individuals.

Award recipients
 2004   Margaret Somerville, Canada
 2006   Abdallah Daar, Canada
 2010   Renzong Qiu, China
 2015   Zabta Khan Shinwari, Pakistan
 2019   Donald A. Brown, USA

References

External links
 Official site

Science and technology awards
Philosophy awards
Awards established in 2004
UNESCO awards